Lecce is a surname. Notable people with the surname include:

  (born 1993), Italian footballer
 Stephen Lecce (born 1986), Canadian politician
 Tony Lecce (born 1945), Italian–born Canadian soccer player